Čarli TV is a Slovenian music television station.

TV SHOWS
 Dinamit
 Aktual Naglas,
 Beatz,
 Frishno,
 Brihta

Television channels in Slovenia
Television channels and stations established in 2002
Mass media in Ljubljana
2002 establishments in Slovenia